The Pakistan Science Foundation (PSF) is an institution under the Ministry of Science and Technology  of the Government of Pakistan. It funds scientific studies, research and development. The Pakistan Science Foundation also operates and administrates the Pakistan Museum of Natural History, and the Pakistan Scientific and Technological Information Center. It was formed in 1973 through an Act passed by the Parliament of Pakistan. As of November 2019, the Chairperson of the PSF is Major (retired) Qaiser Malik.

References

External links
 Pakistan Science Foundation

Pakistan federal departments and agencies
Science and technology in Pakistan
P
Foundations based in Pakistan
Government agencies established in 1973